The Harrison County School District is a public school district based in Gulfport, Mississippi, United States.

In addition to serving portions of Gulfport and Biloxi, the district also serves the city of D'Iberville, the communities of Lizana, Lyman, Pineville, Saucier and Woolmarket, as well as most of rural Harrison County.

History
The Harrison County School District was created in 1957 as a result of a statewide reorganization plan passed into law by Mississippi Legislature. Districts coming together to form the new district were Pineville, Lyman, Orange Grove, Turkey Creek, North Gulfport, Woolmarket, D'Iberville, Saucier, Lizana and parts of the Dedeaux and the Sellers district. Past superintendents include R.L. Ladner, Esco Smith, R.D. "Bobby" Ladner, Henry Arledge, and Roy Gill. Mitchell King, appointed in 2021, is the district's current superintendent.

District Administration

Superintendent
Mitchell King

School Board
Rena Wiggins, District I Board Member
Tom Daniels, District II Board Member
David Ladner, District III Board Member
Dr. Barbara Thomas, District IV Board Member
Eric Simmons, District V Board Member
Directors
Averie Bush, Athletic Director
Dorene Hansen, Curriculum and Accountability Director
Melissa Garrison, Federal Programs Director
Brad Barlow, M.S., CDN, Food Services Director
Eddie Slade, Maintenance Supervisor
Cathy Garner, Security & Internal Compliance Director
Sheila Curtis, Special Education Director
Dr. Laretta Marks, Student Services Director
Mike Valdez, Technology Director
Thad Shaw, Transportation Supervisor

Schools

Elementary/Middle Schools (Grades K-8)
Bel-Aire Elementary School (K-6)
Creekbend Elementary & Middle School (K-8)
Crossroads Elementary School (K-6)
D'Iberville Elementary School (K-3)
D'Iberville Middle School (4-8)
Harrison Central Elementary School (K-3)
Lizana Elementary School (K-6)
Lyman Elementary School (K-6)
North Gulfport Elementary/Middle School (K-8)
North Woolmarket Elementary/Middle School (K-8)
Orange Grove Elementary School (4-6)
Pineville Elementary School (K-6)
River Oaks Elementary School (K-6)
Saucier Elementary School (K-6)
Three Rivers Elementary School (K-6)
West Harrison Middle School (7-8)
West Wortham Elementary/Middle School (K-8)
Woolmarket Elementary School (K-6)

High Schools (Grades 9-12)
D'Iberville High School
Harrison Central High School
West Harrison High School

Demographics

2018-19 school year
There were a total of 14,780 students enrolled in the Harrison County School District during the 2018-2019 school year. The gender makeup of the district was 48.6% female and 51.35% male. The racial makeup of the district was 34.61% African American, 51.47% White, 6.01% Hispanic, 2.5% Asian, 0.31% Native American, .30% Native Hawaiian or Pacific Islander, and 4.78% Two or More Races. 45.9% of the district's students were eligible to receive free lunch.

Previous school years

* = Data Unavailable

Accountability statistics

See also
List of school districts in Mississippi

References

External links

Education in Harrison County, Mississippi
Gulfport, Mississippi
School districts in Mississippi
1957 establishments in Mississippi
School districts established in 1957